Little Mullet Key is an island in the Florida Keys in Monroe County, Florida, United States. It is within the boundaries of the Key West National Wildlife Refuge.

Located in the Outlying Islands of the Florida Keys, it is in the northern Mule Keys that are 9 miles (15 km) west of Key West.

References

Islands of the Florida Keys
Islands of Monroe County, Florida
Islands of Florida